The siege of Dijon between 8 and 13 September 1513 was a successful campaign of the Swiss army against the French city of Dijon during the War of the League of Cambrai.

After the French had lost the Battle of Novara, several contingents of Swiss mercenaries did follow the French withdrawal to Dijon. After a few days of siege, the city had to surrender. In the peace-treaty all the demands of the Swiss were met: the renunciation of France on Milan, Cremona and Asti as well as a war indemnity of 400,000 crowns.

Notes

References

 Goubert, Pierre. The Course of French History. Translated by Maarten Ultee. New York: Franklin Watts, 1988. .
 

1513 in France
Dijon 1513
Dijon 1513
Dijon 1513
Novara 1513
Battles of the War of the League of Cambrai
Battles in Bourgogne-Franche-Comté